The 2006 Miami FC season was the first season of the new team and club in the USL First Division.
This year, the team finished in fifth place for the regular season and made it to the first round of the playoffs.

Regular season

Standings

First Division

Playoffs

References

External links

2006
Fort Lauderdale Strikers
Miami FC